Telmatobius brachydactylus, the Amable Maria frog, is an endangered species of frog in the family Telmatobiidae.

It is threatened by capture for human consumption. These two are sometimes placed in the genus Batrachophrynus.

References

brachydactylus
Amphibians of the Andes
Amphibians of Peru
Endemic fauna of Peru
Taxonomy articles created by Polbot
Amphibians described in 1873
Taxa named by Wilhelm Peters